Tiruvalla railway station (station code : TRVL) is a railway station located at Thiruvalla town in Pathanamthitta district, Kerala, India. The station is under Thiruvananthapuram railway division of Southern Railway. It is an NSG 4 category station and has daily trains to cities like Thiruvananthapuram, Kochi, Kozhikode, Mangalore, Bangalore, Coimbatore, Madurai, Chennai, Hyderabad, Tirupati, Pune, Bhopal, Mumbai and New Delhi.

Layout 

Tiruvalla railway station has three platforms and five tracks. Both long and short-distance trains stop at Tiruvalla, and at present the station is a way-side station, though terminal facilities could be developed. The Tiruvalla station lies in the Kayankulam Junction–Kottayam–Ernakulam route, and along with the nearby Chengannur railway station, is an important station en route.

Modernisation 

The Indian Railways have included Tiruvalla railway station in its development plan for 2016–17. The platform work and doubling of the track are in progress. Battery operated buggies may be introduced at the Tiruvalla station soon, which shall also facilitate the ferrying of the elderly and physically challenged people in the railway station. At present, the platforms are not fully covered, and the full covering of all platforms including the fourth shall also be implemented. Installation of escalators is also considered, connecting the four platforms.Now erection of an escalator is in progress.

The Railways would also set up a covered vehicle parking area near the Railway Mail Service complex, besides an upper class waiting room and VIP lounge at the railway station.

Significance

Tiruvalla railway station is the only railway station in the district of Pathanamthitta. The main importance of this station is highlighted by the fact that Sabarimala, a pilgrimage centre, is located in this district. The station, apart from facilitating the traffic of the residents of the commercial centre of Thiruvalla town and the workers from other states, is the main refuge for people living in the hilly tracts of Mallappally, Ranni, Kozhencherry, as well as the low-lying areas of Upper Kuttanad. It is also the alighting point for pilgrimage centres like Sabarimala, Parumala Church, Sree Vallabha Temple, Chakkulathukavu Temple, St. George Forane Church, Edathua, as well as the cave temple and the old Shiva Temple of Tiruvalla at Kaviyoor.

Facilities
 Computerised reservation ticket centre
 Computerised unreserved ticket centre
 Passenger information centre
 Tourist information centre
 IRCTC restaurant
 Passenger waiting rooms
 Foot overbridge
 ATM
 Prepaid autorikshaw counter
 Prepaid parking space

Proposals for new routes
 A line from Tiruvalla to Thakazhi, a village in Alappuzha district (thus connecting the Kottayam and Alappuzha parallel rail lines) has been proposed.
 A line connecting Tiruvalla to Pamba (nearest point of Sabarimala) via Ranni is waiting for approval.

See also
Ernakulam–Kottayam–Kayamkulam line
Trivandrum Central

Karunagappalli railway station

Mavelikara railway station
Chengannur railway station
Changanasseri railway station
Kottayam railway station

Thiruvananthapuram railway division
Template:Ernakulam–Kottayam–Kayamkulam–Kollam line

References

External links

 Arrivals at TRVL/Tiruvalla. IndiaRailInfo.com

Railway stations in Pathanamthitta district
Thiruvananthapuram railway division
Thiruvalla